Shamil Zubairov is an Azerbaijani freestyle wrestler who currently competes at 92 kilograms. In 2018, Zubairov went on to become the World and European Champion in the U23 level. In 2019, he once again medaled at the U23 European Championship.

Major results

External links

References 

Living people
Date of birth missing (living people)
Place of birth missing (living people)
Azerbaijani male sport wrestlers
Year of birth missing (living people)
21st-century Azerbaijani people